MLS Cup 2019 was the 24th edition of the MLS Cup, the championship match of Major League Soccer (MLS), and took place on November 10, 2019, at CenturyLink Field in Seattle, Washington, United States. The soccer match was contested by Seattle Sounders FC and Toronto FC to determine the champion of the 2019 season. It was a rematch of the 2016 and 2017 editions of the MLS Cup, which were won by Seattle and Toronto, respectively. This was the third final for both teams and the first to be hosted by the Sounders, as both of the previous Seattle–Toronto finals were held at BMO Field in Toronto, Ontario, Canada.

The Sounders won 3–1 to claim their second MLS Cup title, in front of 69,274 spectators at CenturyLink Field, setting a new stadium record. All four of the goals were scored in the second half, beginning with a deflected shot by Kelvin Leerdam and followed by strikes from substitute Víctor Rodríguez (later named the match MVP) and Raúl Ruidíaz; Jozy Altidore scored a late consolation goal for Toronto in stoppage time. The match marked the conclusion of the 2019 MLS Cup Playoffs, which was contested by fourteen teams under a new single-elimination format that replaced the former two-legged ties. As a result, this was the earliest calendar date for the MLS Cup showdown since 2002.

The defending MLS Cup champions were Atlanta United FC, who were eliminated in the Eastern Conference Finals by Toronto FC. As MLS Cup champions, Seattle qualified for the 2020 CONCACAF Champions League and the later-cancelled 2020 Campeones Cup.

Road to the final

The MLS Cup is the post-season championship of Major League Soccer (MLS), a professional club soccer league in the United States and Canada. The 2019 season was the 24th in MLS history, and was contested by 24 teams organized into the eastern and western conferences. Each club played 34 matches during the regular season from March to October, facing each team in their conference twice and those in the other conference once. The playoffs, running from October to early November, were contested between the top seven clubs in each conference through four rounds. Each round had a single-elimination match hosted by the higher-seeded team, a change from the two-legged ties used in previous seasons; the top team in each conference was also given a bye to the Conference Semifinals. The shortened playoff schedule moved the date of the final to November 10, its earliest staging since 2002.

The finalists, Seattle Sounders FC and Toronto FC, played each other in the MLS Cup final for the third time in four years, following their participation in the 2016 and 2017 finals. Both matches were hosted in Toronto, with the 2016 cup won by Seattle in a penalty shootout and the 2017 cup won by Toronto in regulation time. The two teams had met 14 times in regular season play, with Seattle winning nine times. Seattle and Toronto played each other once in the 2019 regular season, ending in a 3–2 win for the Sounders at home in April.

Seattle Sounders FC

Seattle Sounders FC played in their third MLS Cup final in four seasons, having won in their first appearance in 2016 under manager Brian Schmetzer. The team had qualified for the playoffs in all of their eleven MLS seasons and finished as runner-up in MLS Cup 2017. In 2018, the team finished second in the Western Conference through a late-season winning streak, but were knocked out by the Portland Timbers in the Conference Semifinals during a penalty shootout. During the 2019 offseason, the Sounders lost defensive midfielder and captain Osvaldo Alonso, who was released into free agency and signed by Minnesota United FC.

The Sounders made few offseason moves, signing several homegrown players for use by their affiliate team, and went winless in preseason matches. The team lost once in their opening 13 matches of the season, including a six-match unbeaten streak, but lost veteran center-back Chad Marshall when he retired in late May. Earlier in the month, the Sounders had signed center-back Xavier Arreaga to a Designated Player contract and left-back Joevin Jones upon his return to the team from the 2. Bundesliga.

The team lost several players to injuries and international call-ups in June and had a three-match losing streak before recovering to win four matches in late June and early July. Seattle then lost defender Román Torres in early August to a ten-match suspension for performance-enhancing substances and were winless in four matches before defeating the Portland Timbers. Seattle won four of their last seven matches to clinch a playoff berth and finish second in the Western Conference behind Los Angeles FC (LAFC), who won the Supporters' Shield and set new league records for points and goal differential.

In the first round of the playoffs, Seattle hosted FC Dallas and struck first through Raúl Ruidíaz and Jordan Morris to take a 2–0 lead in the first half, but conceded a goal before halftime. Dallas's Matt Hedges tied the match in the 64th minute, but Morris briefly restored the Sounders' lead before the match was tied 3–3 by the end of regulation time. In extra time, Morris completed his first career hat-trick with a goal in the 113th minute to cap a 4–3 victory. Seattle went on to host Real Salt Lake in the Conference Semifinals and won 2–0 with a goal and assist from Nicolás Lodeiro in the second half. Gustav Svensson opened the scoring in the 64th minute by heading in a corner kick taken by Lodeiro, which was followed up by a strike of his own in the 81st minute on a counterattack. The team extended their home winning streak in the playoffs to eleven matches.

The Sounders traveled to play Los Angeles FC in the Western Conference Final at Banc of California Stadium. LAFC took the lead in the 17th minute through a free kick by Eduard Atuesta, but Seattle scored twice within nine minutes with goals on transitions by Ruidíaz and Lodeiro to close out the first half. Ruidíaz added a second goal for himself, shooting from just outside the  box, and the team prevented involvement from LAFC captain and MLS scoring leader Carlos Vela to complete a 3–1 upset victory that returned the Sounders to the MLS Cup final.

Toronto FC

Toronto FC won their first MLS Cup in 2017, which also completed the first domestic treble in MLS history after the team also won the Supporters' Shield and Canadian Championship during the same season. The team finished the 2018 season in ninth place in the Eastern Conference, failing to qualify for the playoffs, and lost key players Sebastian Giovinco and Víctor Vázquez to teams in the Middle East. General manager Tim Bezbatchenko also left the club to take on a role with the Columbus Crew SC, but head coach Greg Vanney remained for his sixth season with Toronto.

During the preseason, Toronto's new general manager Ali Curtis signed several MLS returnees, including midfielder Nick DeLeon and defender Laurent Ciman. The club also acquired Spanish attacking midfielder Alejandro Pozuelo from Genk on a Designated Plated contract. During the summer transfer window, Toronto also signed U.S. defender Omar Gonzalez on his return from Liga MX, Venezuelan midfielder Erickson Gallardo, and midfielder Nicolas Benezet on loan from French club Guingamp.

The club began their season in the CONCACAF Champions League, having qualified as the winners of the Canadian Championship, and lost 5–1 on aggregate to Panamanian club Club Independiente in the Round of 16. Toronto opened the MLS regular season with three wins against Eastern Conference opponents, tying a franchise record for best start, but earned only two more wins in their next 13 games, which also included an eight-match winless streak lasting into late June.

Several key players were called away to their national teams to play in the Gold Cup, but returned to begin the second half of the season with four wins in eight matches by the end of July. The addition of several depth players in the summer transfer window, including Gonzalez, Benezet, and Patrick Mullins, also improved the team's defense. In their last ten regular season matches, Toronto went undefeated with four wins and six draws, finishing fourth in the Eastern Conference. Forward Jozy Altidore left the final match of the regular season with a quadriceps injury that kept him out of the playoffs. The team also lost the Canadian Championship Final to the Montreal Impact in September, leaving them without a berth in the 2020 CONCACAF Champions League.

Toronto hosted fifth-place D.C. United in the first round of the playoffs at BMO Field and took a half-time lead through a goal by Marky Delgado, who capitalized on a goalkeeping mistake from Bill Hamid. Lucas Rodríguez equalized for D.C. in stoppage time at the end of the second half, forcing the match into extra time. Toronto proceeded to score four unanswered goals, including two in the first five minutes from Richie Laryea and Jonathan Osorio. Osorio added his second in the 103rd minute and was followed two minutes later by Nick DeLeon to complete a 5–1 victory in the first half of extra time.

The team traveled to play top-seeded New York City FC (NYCFC) in the Conference Semifinals, earning a 2–1 victory at Citi Field. After a scoreless first half, Pozuelo scored two minutes into the second half after receiving a ball off a failed header from New York's Maxime Chanot. NYCFC equalized through a shot by Ismael Tajouri-Shradi, who made a late run into the box in the 69th minute, but Toronto earned a penalty in the 90th minute that was converted by Pozuelo with a Panenka for a 2–1 win. Toronto continued to the Eastern Conference Finals, where they faced defending MLS Cup champions Atlanta United FC at their home stadium. Atlanta took the lead in the fourth minute through a goal by Julian Gressel and were awarded a penalty kick minutes later for a foul by Michael Bradley, but the 11th-minute penalty taken by Josef Martínez was saved by goalkeeper Quentin Westberg. Two minutes later, Nicolas Benezet scored with a curling shot from the edge of the box to equalize for Toronto; the Reds completed their 2–1 upset victory with a  strike from Nick DeLeon that beat goalkeeper Brad Guzan. The team reached the MLS Cup final, their third in four seasons, on a thirteen-match unbeaten streak across MLS competitions.

Summary of results
Note: In all results below, the score of the finalist is given first (H: home; A: away).

Venue and preparations

MLS Cup 2019 was hosted by the Sounders at their home stadium, CenturyLink Field in Seattle, Washington. It was the venue's second time as MLS Cup host, as the 2009 edition was played there as a neutral-site venue; at the time, the stadium was named Qwest Field. The 69,000-seat stadium opened in 2002 as a shared venue for the National Football League's Seattle Seahawks and soccer, with the Sounders entering MLS seven years later.

The Sounders announced that they would open all seating areas in the upper deck of the stadium for the MLS Cup final, making a total of 69,000 seats available, a change from previous rounds of the playoffs that were limited to 37,722 seats. Tickets were distributed to season ticket holders after the Eastern Conference Final, selling 50,000 seats, and were released for public sale beginning November 1. The remaining tickets were sold out within 20 minutes of the public release, including 3,000 allocated to away fans by the league. Prices for tickets on secondary markets peaked at an average of $622, surpassing all but one Seattle sporting event on SeatGeek. The club released a limited number of standing-room only tickets at the box office prior to the match that were also sold out.

The Sounders hosted several fan events during the MLS Cup weekend, including the installation of a giant replica of the Philip F. Anschutz Trophy at Pike Place Market and the lighting of several city landmarks in rave green. The MLS Cup trophy was also taken on a tour of the city, arriving aboard a state ferry and sent to the Space Needle to be displayed with former Sounders goalkeeper Kasey Keller. The club also organized a viewing party at Occidental Park with a concert by Sounders minority owner Macklemore. A seismograph was temporarily installed at the stadium by the Pacific Northwest Seismic Network to record fan reactions to events. Sound Transit ran several Sounder commuter train trips to King Street Station to accommodate the expected number of fans.

Broadcasting

The match was broadcast in the United States on ABC in English, for the first time since 2008, and Univision in Spanish. In Canada, coverage was provided by TSN4 in English and TVA Sports in French. On ABC, ESPN's Jon Champion called the play-by-play with color commentator Taylor Twellman, who also hosted previews on SportsCenter and ESPN+. The Univision broadcast featured Jorge Luis López Salido, Raúl Guzmán, Diego Balado, and Marcelo Balboa. The TSN broadcast, which included a simulcast on TSN Radio 1050 in the Toronto area, was headlined by play-by-play commentator Luke Wileman and color analyst Steven Caldwell.

The ABC broadcast averaged 823,000 viewers and peaked in the second half with 1.1 million viewers, including a 13.2 local rating in the Seattle–Tacoma market. The Univision broadcast averaged 447,000 viewers, while the TSN4 broadcast in Canada averaged 748,000 viewers.

Match

Summary

The national anthem was performed by Pearl Jam's Mike McCready on his electric guitar as the Emerald City Supporters unveiled a tifo that was choreographed with a card display from the entire stadium. Both teams fielded most of their regular starting lineups, with Seattle starting Román Torres in place of Xavier Arreaga and Toronto replacing Laurent Ciman with Omar Gonzalez. Allen Chapman was assigned as the head referee for the match, reprising his role from the 2017 Toronto–Seattle final.

Toronto had the majority of possession and attacking chances in the first half, with the Sounders responding with counterattacks and defending from turnovers. Seattle goalkeeper Stefan Frei made several saves to keep Toronto scoreless, blocking a pair of shots by Nicolas Benezet and another from Jonathan Osorio. In the last minute before first half stoppage time, Sounders forward Raúl Ruidíaz broke away from Toronto defender Omar Gonzalez with a chance to score, but his shot was unable to go past goalkeeper Quentin Westberg.

Seattle manager Brian Schmetzer responded at halftime by moving Jordan Morris to the right wing and Joevin Jones to the left, while Toronto made no significant adjustments. The scoring deadlock for the Sounders was broken in the 57th minute by right-back Kelvin Leerdam, who collected a ball from Ruidíaz and attempted a cross to the back-post that was instead deflected into the goal by Toronto defender Justin Morrow. Toronto's players protested that the goal was preceded by a foul on Jonathan Osorio by Cristian Roldan, but the goal stood and was awarded to Leerdam by match officials after confusion over whether it counted as an own goal. Toronto manager Greg Vanney responded by substituting Benezet for forward Jozy Altidore, who had missed the playoffs with an injury.

The attacking momentum of the match changed in Seattle's favor, with several chances falling to the Sounders that they were unable to finish. Víctor Rodríguez, who had entered the match as a substitute in the 60th minute, added a second goal for Seattle in the 76th minute with a strike from atop the penalty area after a laid-off ball from Nicolás Lodeiro. Toronto attempted to halve the lead in the 87th minute with a header from Omar Gonazlez that went wide as he collided with Sounders goalkeeper Stefan Frei. At the end of regulation time, Ruidíaz out-muscled Chris Mavinga while chasing a long overhead ball from Gustav Svensson and beat Westberg to score the team's third and final goal of the match. Jozy Altidore earned a consolation goal for Toronto with a header in the third minute of stoppage time as the match ended with a 3–1 scoreline.

Details

Post-match

The Sounders became the sixth team to win multiple MLS Cup titles and ended a 267-minute scoreless streak in MLS Cup play with Leerdam's goal. The match was the first MLS Cup final since the 2012 edition to feature four or more goals. The announced attendance of 69,274 was the second-highest for an MLS Cup final and set new records for the largest sporting event at the stadium and soccer attendance in state history. Sounders midfielder Victor Rodríguez was named the MLS Cup most valuable player for scoring the winning goal; he left the club less than two weeks later with the intent of returning to his native Spain. A victory parade took place on November 12 in Downtown Seattle, running from Westlake Park to a rally at the Seattle Center, and was attended by thousands of fans. The club's two MLS Cup trophies also made several stops around Seattle landmarks as part of a victory tour for fans, including several trips on the Washington State Ferries system. The Washington state delegation to the United States Congress introduced congratulatory resolutions to honor the Sounders and their successful season.

As MLS Cup champions, the Sounders earned $275,000 in prize money, while Toronto earned $80,000. Seattle also earned a berth in the 2020 CONCACAF Champions League, despite having already qualified in another slot as the highest-ranked regular season team to remain in the playoffs. They were eliminated in the Round of 16 by Honduran club C.D. Olimpia in a penalty shootout at CenturyLink Field following a 4–4 tie on aggregate. The Sounders were also scheduled to host the 2020 Campeones Cup in August against the winner of the Mexican Campeón de Campeones, but the match was cancelled due to the COVID-19 pandemic.

The Sounders went on to play in the 2020 edition of the MLS Cup after a shortened season due to the COVID-19 pandemic. They were unable to defend their title, losing 3–0 to hosts Columbus Crew SC.

References

External links
 MLS Cup Playoffs

2019
2019 Major League Soccer season
Seattle Sounders FC matches
Toronto FC matches
Sports competitions in Seattle
November 2019 sports events in the United States
2019 in Seattle